Here At The End Of All Things is a CD/DVD by American mathcore band The Number Twelve Looks Like You. It was taped on December 15, 2007 in South Hackensack, New Jersey. The title comes from a quote from the book The Lord of the Rings: The Return of the King.

Track listing

CD
"Jay Walking Backwards" - 6:52
"Don't get Blood on my Prada Shoes" - 2:23
"The Weekly Wars" - 4:48
"Texas Dolly" - 3:40
"The Proud Parents Convention held in the ER" - 3:31
"Grandfather" - 4:39
"Texas Dolly (J. Kale Gilgore Tribute)" - 3:02
"Weekly Wars (Endor Remix)" [*]- 4:45
"Imagine Nation Express (Jesse Cannon Remix)" [*]- 4:53
"Track 10" (silence) - 12:12
"Jesus & Tori", "Civeta Dei", and "Sleeping with the Fishes, See?" - 20:48

[*] Also featured as the Remixes 7"

DVD
 Full Concert
 Interview
 "Grandfather" Music Video
 "Like A Cat" Music Video

The Number Twelve Looks Like You albums
2008 live albums
2008 video albums
Live video albums